Sadruddin Mohammad Hossain, Bir Protik is a former chief of Bangladesh Air Force. His grandchildren consist of Adeena Hossain, Fariha Hossain, Samiha Hossain, Adeeb Hossain, Farzad Hossain, Zaria Ahsan, Turaia Ahsan, Homum Ahsan and Zohair Ahsan

Career
Air Vice Marshal Sadruddin was the 5th Chief of Bangladesh Air Force from 9	December 1977 to 22 July 1981. He was the youngest Air Chief in the history of Bangladesh Air Force (at the age of 36). Upon graduating from Lower Topa Cadet College, he resumed his career as a fighter pilot in the Pakistan Air Force in 1959, flying mainly the North American F-86 Sabre and the Dassault Mirage III. He was one of the top 20 cadets who was sent to the United States for advanced training at the United States Air Force. He was stationed in Valdosta, Georgia at Moody AFB and also at Luke AFB in Glendale, Arizona from 1960 to 1962. He had also received military training in China.

He is credited with at least two joint kills of Indian Folland Gnats during the Indo-Pakistani War of 1965. He was promoted to Squadron Leader in 1968 and was posted as the commander of a 3-aircraft flight under an attack squadron at Sargodha. In April 1971 he quit Pakistan Air Force to join the Bangladesh Liberation War against Pakistan. During the Liberation War he was a liaison officer between the Mukti Bahini and the Indian Air Force, and was stationed in Sector 6. After the Liberation War of 1971 between Bangladesh and Pakistan, he was promoted to Wing Commander and placed in command of the Dhaka Airbase of the newly formed Bangladesh Air Force. His next appointment was as Group Captain and Defence Attache at the Bangladesh Embassy in Moscow, Russia where he spent 3.5 years with his wife, daughter, Tahmina Hossain, older son, Sarwaruddin Mohammad Hossain, and oldest son, Farid Hossain. After completing this assignment, Group Captain Sadruddin returned to Bangladesh in 1977 and was assigned as Director of the Bangladesh Air Force Air Operations & Air Intelligence. He was promoted to Air Commodore and Chief of the Air Staff in 1977.

References

 

Bangladesh Air Force air marshals
Living people
Bangladeshi military personnel
1938 births
Chiefs of Air Staff (Bangladesh)
People from Narail District
Mukti Bahini personnel